Dimitrios Theodorakakos is a  Greek long-distance and trail runner. He was born on 5 December 1978 in Gytheio and resides in Athens. Since November 2016 he competes for Panathinaikos.

References

External links

1978 births
Living people
Greek male long-distance runners
Panathinaikos Athletics
People from East Mani
Sportspeople from the Peloponnese